Brickyard Cove is a body of water in the Brickyard Cove neighborhood of the Point Richmond area of Richmond, California. The cove is situated between the Harbor Channel, a deepwater shipping channel that connects the San Francisco Bay with the Port of Richmond and the mainland. The cove is located between Point Potrero and Ferry Point. A marina is located in the cove and the Red Oak Victory part of Rosie the Riveter/World War II Homefront National Historic Park is docked in the western end of the cove.

Brickyard Cove was once home to Richmond Brick Company. Richmond Brick Company used the area to create bricks used to build various structures in "Point Richmond" and various other structures on the East Coast. The "Bee-Hive" Kilns are still present onsite. Richmond Brick Company was owned by the "Sevy Family".

References

Bodies of water of Richmond, California
Coves of the United States
Bays of California
Bays of Contra Costa County, California